Mount Coates is an Antarctic peak,  high, just east of Borns Glacier in the Kukri Hills of Victoria Land. It was named by the Western Journey Party, led by Thomas Griffith Taylor, of the British Antarctic Expedition, 1910–13.

It was named after a lifelong friend of Thomas Griffith Taylor, Harold Coates from Oldham, Lancashire, who also sponsored the Siberian ponies on Scott's expedition.

References
 

Mountains of Victoria Land
McMurdo Dry Valleys